Qaleh-ye Khan (also Romanized as Qal‘eh-ye Khān and Qal’eh Khān; also known as Ghal‘eh Khan) is a village in Miyan Ab Rural District, in the Central District of Shushtar County, Khuzestan Province, Iran. At the 2006 census, its population was 268, in 53 families.

References 

Populated places in Shushtar County